Roger J.R. Levesque (born October 17, 1963) is professor in the Department of Criminal Justice at Indiana University, as well as an affiliated professor of law in the Indiana University Maurer School of Law. He is the editor-in-chief of the Journal of Youth and Adolescence, New Criminal Law Review, and Adolescent Research Review. He is a fellow of the Association for Psychological Science, the American Psychological Association, the American Psychology–Law Society, and the Society for the Psychological Study of Social Issues.

In 2016, Levesque was editor for Adolescents, Rapid Social Change, and the Law: The Transforming Nature of Protection.

References

External links
Faculty page at Indiana University Maurer School of Law
Faculty page at Indiana University Department of Criminal Justice

Living people
1963 births
Indiana University faculty
American criminologists
University of Chicago alumni
Academic journal editors
Fellows of the Association for Psychological Science
Fellows of the American Psychological Association